Sir John Williams, 2nd Baronet  (c. 1651 – November 1704) was a Welsh member of parliament, representing the constituencies of Monmouth Boroughs (February 1689 – 1690) and Monmouthshire (1698–1704).

He was one of the Williams baronets. He succeeded Sir Trevor Williams, 1st Baronet and was succeeded by Sir Hopton Williams, 3rd Baronet.

References

1650s births
1704 deaths
Year of birth uncertain
Baronets in the Baronetage of England
English MPs 1689–1690
English MPs 1698–1700
English MPs 1701
English MPs 1701–1702
English MPs 1702–1705